Talang 2010 was the fourth season of the talent show Talang, the Swedish version of Got Talent. Talang 2010 had its premiere on April 2, 2010 and ended on June 4, 2010. The winner of the show was the 15-year-old opera singer Jill Svensson, and 9-year-old violinist Daniel Lozakovitj came runner-up. Hosts and judges were the same as in Talang 2009. Omar Rudberg was a contestant.

Turnén

Castings
12 December 2009 - Norrköping, Hageby centre
9 January 2010 - Borås, Knalleland
23 January 2010 -  Lycksele, Åhléns
23 January 2010 - Akalla, ICA Maxi
24 January 2010 -  Sundschoicel, Birsta city
30 January 2010 -  Uddechoicela, Torp shopping centre
31 January 2010 -  Jönköping, A6 center
6 February 2010 - Stockholm, Globen shopping centre
7 February 2010 - Linköping, IKANO-house
13 February 2010 - Löddeköpinge, Lödde centre
20 February  2010 - Stockholm, Saltsjöbadens centre
21 February 2010 - Stockholm, Stinsen
27 February 2010 - Luleå, Street maal

Semi-final Summary

 Judge Disapproved |  Judge Approved
 |  |

Semi-final 1

Semi-final 2

Semi-final 3

Final

 Judge Disapproved |  Judge Approved

References

Talang (Swedish TV series)
2010 Swedish television seasons